Eleutherodactylus klinikowskii is a species of frog in the family Eleutherodactylidae endemic to Cuba. Its natural habitats are tropical moist lowland forest and rocky areas.

References

klinikowskii
Endemic fauna of Cuba
Amphibians of Cuba
Amphibians described in 1959
Taxonomy articles created by Polbot